The beautiful mantella, Parker's mantella, or splendid mantella (Mantella pulchra) is a species of frogs in the family Mantellidae.

It is endemic to Madagascar.
Its natural habitats are subtropical or tropical moist lowland forests, subtropical or tropical swamps, and swamps.
It is threatened by habitat loss. It may be threatened by the pet trade, but too little is known about commercial collections.

References

Mantella
Endemic frogs of Madagascar
Species endangered by grazing
Species endangered by subsistence agriculture
Species endangered by logging for timber
Species endangered by logging for charcoal
Species endangered by invasive species
Species endangered by urbanization
Species endangered by the pet trade
Amphibians described in 1925
Taxonomy articles created by Polbot